A list of Japanese films that were first released in 2018.

Highest-grossing films
The following is a list of the top 10 highest-grossing Japanese films released at the Japanese box office in 2018.

Film releases

January – March

April - June

July - September

October - December

See also
 2018 in Japan
 2018 in Japanese television
 List of 2018 box office number-one films in Japan

Notes

References

External links
 

Film
2018
Lists of 2018 films by country or language